Shorkot Cantonment Junction railway station (Urdu and ) is located in Shorkot cantonment area near Shorkot city, Jhang district of Punjab province, Pakistan.

See also
 List of railway stations in Pakistan
 Pakistan Railways

References

External links

Railway stations in Jhang District
Railway stations on Shorkot–Lalamusa Branch Line
Railway stations on Shorkot–Sheikhupura line
Railway stations on Khanewal–Wazirabad Line